Dev Ross is an American screenwriter, children's book author, performer, director, and producer in theater, film, and television industries.

Writing credits
Ross is a writer in print, animation, and theater, for several media content providers including Disney, ABC, Fox Kids, Universal Cartoon Studios, Cartoon Network, TLC, The Discovery Channel, Nickelodeon, Mattel, the Web, and PBS. Ross worked as story analyst for film production companies and then became a staff writer at Disney Studios in 1991, where she also served as a voice director and "story doctor". During 2007, Ross worked for the Samsung Corporation in South Korea teaching university courses in digital screenwriting at both the graduate and undergraduate levels.

Ross wrote for several popular shows during the 1990s. These included Darkwing Duck, Jakers! The Adventures of Piggley Winks, Winnie the Pooh and Chip 'n Dale: Rescue Rangers, Return of Jafar, Monster High, Animated Classic Showcase, Clifford the Big Red Dog, Clifford's Puppy Days, and the Adventures from the Book of Virtues. She helped bring movie characters to television with Aladdin and The Little Mermaid.

Children's books
Ross wrote a number of children's books for the popular "We Both Read" series.

Television and animation awards

Straight to video releases
Return of Jafar
Balto II: Wolf Quest
The Land Before Time II: The Great Valley Adventure
The Land Before Time III: The Time of the Great Giving
The Land Before Time IV: Journey Through the Mists
The Land Before Time IX: Journey to Big Water

Performing arts
Before turning to animation, Ross was the Artistic Director of the "Twelfth Night Repertory Company", a tri-city educational theatre and three time Emmy award winning television troupe from 1980-1982 where she was a writer, director, and performer. Ross wrote and directed more than 70 plays for TNRC and Educational Theater Company, before leaving the schools. She even created a "synthesis of movement, text and sound", for which the schools became noted.

Prior to 2013, Ross's Theatrical awards include:
Drama-Logue Award for Best New Musical Play, Westwood Playhouse - "Once Upon a Genesis"

As of 2013, Ross is the creator and head writer of her own original web show called "The Rocks."

References

External links
 
 Dev Ross's YouTube

American entertainment industry businesspeople
Screenwriters from California
American television writers
American voice actresses
American women television writers
American voice directors
Daytime Emmy Award winners
Living people
Writers from Los Angeles
University of California, Los Angeles alumni
Place of birth missing (living people)